Cylindrella may refer to:

 Cylindrella Pfeiffer, 1840, a genus of gastropods in the family Helicidae, synonym of Brachypodella
 Cylindrella Swainson, 1840, a genus of gastropods in the family Cylichnidae, synonym of Cylichna
 Cylindrella Swainson, 1840, a genus of gastropods in the family Conidae, synonym of Asprella